Cahuilla Hills is an unincorporated community in Riverside County, California. It lies at an elevation of 932 feet (284 m).

References

Unincorporated communities in Riverside County, California
Unincorporated communities in California